Hipper may refer to:

 Admiral Hipper (disambiguation)
 Admiral Franz von Hipper
 German cruiser Admiral Hipper
 River Hipper, a tributary of the River Rother in Derbyshire, England

See also
 Hip (disambiguation)
 Hipster (disambiguation)